Partsaare is a village in Anija Parish, Harju County in northern Estonia, located on the left bank of the Jägala River. Partsaare has a population of 24 (as of 1 January 2010).

References

Villages in Harju County